Manas University was founded according to an agreement between the governments of the Republic of Turkey and the Kyrgyz Republic about establishment of Kyrgyz-Turkish Manas University in Bishkek, which was signed in Izmir on September 30, 1995. The agreement was afterward approved by the competent authorities of both countries. The university began operation in the 1997-1998 academic year.

To be accepted to the university, students from the Kyrgyz Republic must pass a university entrance examination, while students from Turkey are accepted according to their score on the Student Selection and Placement Center examination (TCS), as do other students from Turkic peoples and related communities.

By the end of 2011, there were 3809 undergraduate students studying at 9 faculties, 4 high schools, and 1 vocational school. Also there were 196 graduate students at 2 institutions.

According to the Council of Higher Education (Turkey), the university has the same status as other universities in Turkey. The education in the university is free; students are provided with an Academic Achievement Scholarship. Textbooks are supplied. The educational scholarship is given by the Republic of Turkey. Students are provided with affordable lunches and can apply for accommodation in the dorms.

The teaching languages of the university are Turkish and Kyrgyz as well as English and Russian.
 
Manas University is represented by a multicultural environment with students from 14 countries and regions. Outside of class, students enjoy a lively campus life with a range of sports teams, clubs, and campus events including contests, festivals, career days, tournaments and more.

To supplement learning, KTMU provides internship opportunities for students in the Central Bank of Turkey, the Istanbul Stock Exchange (ISE), Turkey Radio and Television Corporation (TRT), Turkey Union of Chambers and Commodity Exchanges (TOBB), Turkish Ziraat Bank and other institutions.  Students may also participate in exchange programs through Mevlana, ERASMUS PLUS, Open World, US Central Asian Education Foundation.

Research centers
 Biotechnology and Biodiversity Research Center
 Central Asian Studies Center
 Continuous Learning Center
 Distance Education Center
 Students Selection and Placement Center (SSPC)
 Turkic Civilization Research and Application Center

Technology center and laboratories

 Biochemistry Laboratory
 Histology / Morphology Laboratory
 Advanced Computing Laboratory
 Distance Learning Application Center
 Statistics Laboratory
 Computer Graphics Laboratory
 Laboratory Fiction
 Animation Lab
 Graphics Lab
 TV Studio
 Central Research Laboratory (HPLS)
 Environmental Analysis and General Chemistry Laboratory
 Internet Programming Laboratory
 Biomonitoring Laboratory
 Software Development Laboratory
 Research-Based Advanced Computer Laboratory
 Laboratory of Anatomy
 Histology / Embryology Laboratory
 Microbiology Laboratory
 Laboratory of Parasitology
 Laboratory of Biochemistry
 Physiology Laboratory
 Laboratory of Animal Nutrition
 Garden and Field Crops Laboratory
 Fitopology Laboratory
 Laboratory of Entomology and Nemotology
 Theatre Laboratory 
 Kitchen Laboratory
 Laboratory Service Bar
 Front Office Laboratory
 TUMDER - Translation Application and Multimedia Laboratory
 Concrete Laboratory
 Laboratory of Automotive
 CAD Laboratory
 Laboratory of Modern Office
 Masonry Workshop
 Wood Workshop

Graduate schools and programs
* Graduate School of Natural and Applied Sciences
 Biology (MSc)
 Mathematics (MSc/PhD)
 Computer Engineering (MSc/PhD)
 Environmental Engineering (MSc)
 Food Engineering (MSc/PhD)
 Chemical Engineering (MSc)

* Graduate School of Social Sciences
Educational Sciences ( Msc / Phd )
Education Management and Counselling( Ms)
History ( Ms / Phd )
Philosophy ( Ms)
Sociology ( Ms )
Simultaneous Translation ( Ms)
Turcology ( Ms / Phd )
Economics ( Ms / Phd )
Finance ( Ms / Phd )
International Relations ( Ms )
Management ( Ms / Phd )
Islamic Studies ( Ms)
Communication Sciences ( Msc/Phd )
Tourism and Hotel Management ( Ms)

Under Graduate Schools and Departments 
 Faculty of Agriculture
Department of Horticulture and Agronomy
Department of Plant Protection
Department of Animal Science
 Faculty of Communication
Department of Journalism
Department of Public Relations and Advertising
Department of Radio, Television and Cinema
 Faculty of Economics and Administrative Sciences
Department of Economy
Department of Management
Department of Finance
Department of International Relations
Department of Finance and Banking
 Faculty of Engineering
Department of Chemical Engineering
Department of Computer Engineering
Department of Ecological Engineering
Department of Food Engineering
 Faculty of Fine Arts
Department of Painting
Department of Graphics
 Faculty of Letter
Department of Western Languages
Department of Eastern Languages
Department of Educational Science
Department of Philosophy
Department of Sociology
Department of History
Department of Turkology
Department of Translations
 Faculty of Science
Department of Mathematics
Department of Applied Mathematics and Informatics
Department of Biology
 Faculty of Theology
Department of Islamic Studies
Department of Religious Studies
 Faculty of Veterinary

Schools
School of Physical Education and Sports

 Department of Physical Education and Sports TeachingDepartment of Coaching Education

School of Conservatory

 Department of Music Arts
 Department of Scene Arts

School of Tourism and Hotel Management

 Department of Tourism and Hotel Management
 Department of Travel Business and Tourism Guidanсe
 Department of Gastronomy and Сulinary Arts

School of Foreign Languages

 Department of Language Teaching
 Department of Foreign Languages

Housing

Manas University provides students with several housing options. There are two new dorm buildings housing a total of 1456 students, and one subdivided apartment building housing a total of 900 students.

Rankings 
Manas University was ranked 190th among 449 universities of countries from the emerging Europe and Central Asia region in Quacquarelli Symonds EECA University Rankings of 2022.

References

External links 
 Manas University official website (English)

Educational institutions established in 1995
Universities in Bishkek
1995 establishments in Kyrgyzstan